René & Angela were an American R&B duo consisting of musical artists and producers René Moore and Angela Winbush. They formed in 1977 and disbanded in 1986. They are most remembered for their 1985 song "I'll Be Good".

Career
They recorded three albums for Capitol Records: their 1980 self-titled debut René & Angela, the second album Wall to Wall and their final album for the label, 1983's Rise.

They later moved to Mercury Records to release 1985's Street Called Desire. Despite the success of the album, the duo disbanded by the end of 1986. Disagreements and conflicts caused tension with the two singers. Moore claimed the source of tension was due to Winbush lending her songwriting and production talents to other artists – most notably, The Isley Brothers, with whom she wrote and produced their 1987 album Smooth Sailin'. However, Winbush said the demise of the group was due to Moore's violent behavior- including an onstage incident in Cleveland, Ohio in 1986, as well as Winbush singing sole lead on the song "Your Smile", which became a number one hit.

Winbush said of the dissolution of their partnership:

"It was a shame to break up just when we finally got hot. PolyGram didn't want us to break up. But there was no choice. I couldn't work with him anymore."

The duo had a less than amicable split and the animosity was so intense that Moore and Winbush had to communicate through attorneys.

Moore and Winbush went on to successful solo careers as performers, songwriters, and producers. Moore lent his songwriting and production talents to Michael Jackson's 1991 Dangerous and 1995 HIStory albums and later formed Multi-Media Communications, which operated radio stations from 2008 to 2012. Winbush went on to score five top ten R&B hits as a solo artist and wrote and/or produced songs for The Isley Brothers, Sheena Easton, Stephanie Mills and Lalah Hathaway, among others.

Discography

Studio albums

Compilation albums
The Best of René & Angela: Come My Way (1996, Capitol)
Classic Masters (2002, Capitol)

Singles

References

External links

African-American musical groups
American contemporary R&B musical groups
American soul musical groups
American musical duos
Musical groups established in 1977
Musical groups disestablished in 1986
Male–female musical duos
Capitol Records artists
Mercury Records artists